Frank H. Fleet (1848 in New York, New York – June 13, 1900 in New York, New York) was a Major League Baseball player in the 19th century.

External links

1848 births
1900 deaths
Major League Baseball second basemen
Major League Baseball catchers
19th-century baseball players
Baseball players from New York (state)
New York Mutuals players
Brooklyn Eckfords players
Elizabeth Resolutes players
St. Louis Brown Stockings (NA) players
Brooklyn Atlantics players
Minor league baseball managers
Springfield Champion City players
Columbus Buckeyes (minor league) players